Bangsund is a village in the municipality of Namsos in Trøndelag county, Norway. The villages of Klinga and Sævik lie to the northeast along the Norwegian County Road 17.

History

Norsemen referred to it as "Icebound", even though there isn't much ice. Bangsund was originally an extremely old settlement.  In 1886, a worker found a tombstone that dated back to about 500-600 AD.

The original farm was divided into two when its owner, Mickel Bangsund(1693-1774), divided the "farm" in 1770 for his sons; as Ole Mikelsen Bangsund got the Southern 1/2 (or Bangsund-South) and Paul Mikelsen Bangsund got the Northern 1/2 (or Bangsund-North). After the sons had kids and died off, the little farm started growing into a small town.

In 1781, Carl Olsen Bangsund (and two of his brothers; Mikkel Olsen Bangsund and Petter Olsen Bangsund) moved from the Bangsund Farm to Tromsø, Troms, Norway 

The population at Bangsund in 1801 (according to the 1801 census) was 30 people. In 1801 (according to the 1801 census)  there were Bangsunds living in/at Alten, Bangsund, Kasnæs, Seiwåg, Talvig, Tromsø, and Trondhiem, Norway. Other Bangsunds (most likely) had married into other families and had changed their family (surname) due to marriage or due to the "custom" of taking on the new 'farm' name.

The village of Bangsund was the administrative centre of the old municipality of Klinga which existed from 1891 until the dissolution of the municipality in 1964.

One of Bangsund's resources was the "Bangdalsbruket" sawmill.  The mill burned to the ground in 1907 and was rebuilt in 1910. The sawmill was then used until 1980 and is said to have been one of the biggest sawmills in Northern Norway.

The Northern 1/2 (or Bangsund Farm North) became the Grav Farm when in Halvor Julius Bangsund and Pauline Ingebrigtsdatter Selnes’s deed, Pauline handed over the farm to her son Halvor and son-in-law August (husband of Anne Bangsund), used in community of those two owners.

References

Villages in Trøndelag
Namsos